The 1976 New York Cosmos season was the sixth season for the New York Cosmos in the now-defunct North American Soccer League. In the Cosmos' sixth year of existence the club finished second only to the Tampa Bay Rowdies in both the five-team Eastern Division and the 20-team league. The Cosmos returned to the playoffs for the first time in two years, but were eliminated in the conference semifinals by the rival Rowdies. 1976 marked the first year for Giorgio Chinaglia with the club; Chinaglia would go on to become the all-time leading scorer in both Cosmos and NASL history.

Squad  

 

Source:

Results 
Source:

Friendlies

Preseason

Regular season 
Pld = Games Played, W = Wins, L = Losses, GF = Goals For, GA = Goals Against, Pts = Points
6 points for a win, 1 point for a shootout win, 0 points for a loss, 1 point for each goal scored (up to three per game).

Eastern Division Standings

Overall League Placing 

Source:

Matches

Postseason

Overview

First round

Conference semifinals

Conference Championships

Soccer Bowl '76

Matches

References

See also
1976 North American Soccer League season
List of New York Cosmos seasons

New York
New York
New York Cosmos seasons
New York Cosmos